Fischnaller is a German-language surname typical for the region of Tyrol. Notable people with the surname include:

 Dominik Fischnaller, Italian luger
 Franz Fischnaller, Italian digital artist
 Hans Peter Fischnaller, Italian luger
 Kevin Fischnaller, Italian luger
 Manuel Fischnaller (born 1991), Italian footballer
 Roland Fischnaller (snowboarder) (born 1980), Italian snowboarder
 Roland Fischnaller (alpine skier) (born 1975), Italian former alpine skier

German-language surnames